Henry Motego (born 21 May 1964) is a former Kenya international football forward who played for clubs in Kenya and Oman.

Club career
Born in Gucha District, Motego began playing football in the local league for Shabana Kisii. He helped the club gain promotion to the Kenyan Premier League in 1988. After performing well with Shabana, he was noticed by Kenya Breweries F.C. and signed for the club in 1989.

In 1991, Motego signed for Omani league side Al-Oruba SC for two seasons.

Motego returned to play for Kenya Breweries until he retired in 2000.

International career
Motego made several appearances for the Kenya national football team, including six FIFA World Cup qualifying matches. He played for Kenya at the 1988, 1990 and 1992 African Cup of Nations finals.

Career as a manager
After he retired from playing, Motego became an assistant coach with Tusker. He was appointed manager in October 2002.

References

External links

1964 births
Living people
Kenyan footballers
Kenya international footballers
1988 African Cup of Nations players
1990 African Cup of Nations players
1992 African Cup of Nations players
Tusker F.C. players
Al-Orouba SC players
Kenyan expatriate footballers
Expatriate footballers in Oman
Kenyan football managers
Association football forwards